Breakfast on Pluto is an upcoming musical written by Bob Kelly, composed by Duke Special and based on the novel of the same name by Patrick McCabe.

Production 
The musical was scheduled to make its world premiere at the Black Box Theatre as part of the Galway International Arts Festival from 9 to 26 July 2020 (with the official world premiere on 13 July), however due to the COVID-19 pandemic the festival has been cancelled and the musical has been postponed to run in the 2021 festival from 12 to 25 July.

The musical was also scheduled to run at the Olympia Theatre, Dublin from July 30 to August 15, Birmingham Repertory Theatre from 3 to 26 September and Donmar Warehouse, London from 2 October to 21 November 2020. Only the run at the Donmar has announced its decision to postpone the run with new dates to be confirmed.

The production will be directed and co-created by Des Kennedy, music arranged, directed and orchestrated by Jennifer Whyte, choreographed by Jennifer Rooney, set and costume designed by Katie Davenport and lighting designed by Sinéad McKenna.

Cast and characters

References

External links 

 Official website

Irish musicals
Musicals based on novels
LGBT-related musicals